Hallington railway station was a station in Hallington, Lincolnshire.

History 

Hallington railway station was the first station west of Louth on this line.

Passenger services ended on 5 November 1951, goods traffic on 17 December 1956.

The station buildings still stand and are now a private dwelling.

Route

References

Disused railway stations in Lincolnshire
Former Great Northern Railway stations
Railway stations in Great Britain opened in 1876
Railway stations in Great Britain closed in 1951